Westside High School or West Side High School is the name of several high schools, and can refer to:

Westside High School (Craighead County, Arkansas) - near Jonesboro
Westside High School (Augusta, Georgia)
Westside High School (Houston), Texas 
Westside High School (Jacksonville), formerly Nathan Bedford Forrest High School, renamed in 2014
Westside High School (Macon, Georgia) 
Westside High School (Omaha), Nebraska
Westside High School (South Carolina) in Anderson, South Carolina
Westside High School (West Virginia) in Clear Fork, West Virginia
West Side High School (Dayton, Idaho)
West Side High School (Greers Ferry, Arkansas)
Edmondson-Westside High School in Baltimore, Maryland
West Side High School (Gary), Indiana
West Side High School (New Bedford), an alternative junior-senior high school in New Bedford, Massachusetts
West Side High School (New Jersey) in Newark, New Jersey
West Lafayette Junior-Senior High School, Indiana